1 Corinthians 11 is the eleventh chapter of the First Epistle to the Corinthians in the New Testament of the Christian Bible. It was authored by Paul the Apostle and Sosthenes in Ephesus. In this chapter, Paul writes on the conduct of Christians while worshiping together and enjoins the ordinances of headcovering and the Eucharist.

Text
The original text was written in Koine Greek. This chapter is divided into 34 verses.

Textual witnesses
Some early manuscripts containing the text of this chapter are:
Codex Vaticanus (AD 325–350)
Codex Sinaiticus (330–360)
Codex Alexandrinus (400–440)
Codex Ephraemi Rescriptus (~450; complete).
Codex Freerianus (~450; extant verses 9–10, 18–19, 26–27)
Codex Claromontanus (~550)
Codex Coislinianus (~550; extant verses 9–16)

Imitator of Christ (11:1)

Theologian John Gill suggests that these words "more properly close the preceding chapter, than begin a new one", and many commentators agree. Paul concludes his argument in 1 Corinthians 4 in a similar way: "Therefore I urge you, imitate me." The Pulpit Commentary restricts Paul's call to imitation: "I only ask you to imitate me in points in which I imitate Christ".

According to Gill, these words refer to the rules which Paul would have the Corinthians follow him in, as he did Christ: to do all things to the glory of God, and not for his own gain, just as Christ, who does not seek his own glory, but the glory of God who sent him, so all what they did would be in the name of Christ, and to the glory of God.

Woman's headcovering (11:2–16)

In 1 Corinthians 11, Paul enjoins the observance of certain ordinances, including the headcovering and the Eucharist. The passage delivers the teaching that men are to "pray or prophesy" without a cap on the head, while women are to are wear a veil; the practice of headcovering by Christian women was countercultural as the surrounding pagan Greek women prayed unveiled and Jewish men prayed with their heads covered. Ezra Palmer Gould, a professor at the Episcopal Divinity School, noted Paul's use of rhetoric to highlight the importance of the subject: "The long hair and the veil were both intended as a covering of the head, and as a sign of true womanliness, and of the right relation of woman to man; and hence the absence of one had the same significance as that of the other." This is reflected in the patristic homilies of the Early Church Father John Chrysostom, who explained the two coverings—the veil and the natural hair—discussed by Paul in 1 Corinthians 11:

Michael Marlowe, a scholar of biblical languages, explicates this  that Paul the Apostle used in verse 14 and verse 15, in which he relates the propriety of a woman's natural hair to the necessity of a cloth headcovering:

This ordinance continued to be handed down after the apostolic era to the next generations of Christians; writing 150 years after Paul, the early Christian apologist Tertullian stated that the women of the church in Corinth—both virgins and married—practiced veiling, given that Paul the Apostle delivered the teaching to them: "the Corinthians themselves understood him in this manner. In fact, at this very day, the Corinthians do veil their virgins. What the apostles taught, their disciples approve." From the period of the early Church to the late modern period, 1 Corinthians 11 was universally understood to enjoin the wearing of the headcovering throughout the day—a practice that has since waned in Western Europe but has continued in certain parts of the world, such as in the Middle East, Eastern Europe, Northern Africa and the Indian subcontinent, as well as everywhere by Conservative Anabaptists (such as the Conservative Mennonite Churches and the Dunkard Brethren Church), who count veiling as being one of the ordinances of the Church. The early Church Father John Chrysostom explicates that 1 Corinthians 11 enjoins the continual wearing the headcovering by referencing Paul the Apostle's view that being shaven is always dishonourable and his pointing to the angels:

Verse 10, in many early biblical manuscripts (such as certain vg, cop, and arm), is rendered with the word "veil" rather than the word "authority"; the Revised Standard Version reflects this, displaying 1 Corinthians 11:10 as follows: "That is why a woman ought to have a veil on her head, because of the angels." Similarly, a scholarly footnote in the New American Bible notes that presence of the word "authority may possibly be due to mistranslation of an Aramaic word for veil". This mistranslation may be due to "the fact that in Aramaic the roots of the word power and veil are spelled the same." The last-known living connection to the apostles, Irenaeus, penned verse 10 using the word "veil" instead of "authority" in Against Heresies, as did other Church Fathers in their writings, including Hippolytus, Origen, Chrysostom, Jerome, Epiphanius, Augustine, and Bede.

After the 1960s, the practice of headcovering started to wane in the Western World, giving rise to an interpretation of 1 Corinthians 11 by Abel Isaakson that a woman's natural long hair is the sole covering being discussed in the passage. Moderator of the General Assembly of the Free Church of Scotland (Continuing) John W. Keddie contended that verse 6, if a covering was simply any sort of hair, would then read "For if the women have no hair on her head, let her also be shorn", rendering the passage to be nonsensical. Michael Marlowe, a scholar of the Greek language, states that the novel view of labelling the hair as the sole covering in 1 Corinthians 11 is "indefensible" and suggests that it is an attempt "harmonize this passage with modern habits of dress". Additionally, verses five through seven, as well as verse thirteen, of 1 Corinthians 11 use a form of the Greek word for "veiled"/"covered", ; this is contrasted with the Greek word , which is mentioned in verse 15 of the same chapter, in reference to "something cast around"/"a covering". Verse four of 1 Corinthians 11 uses the Greek words  for "head covered", the same Greek words used in Esther 6:12 in the Septuagint where "because he [Haman] had been humiliated, he headed home, draping an external covering over his head" (additionally certain manuscripts of the Septuagint in Esther 6:12 use the Greek words , which is the "perfect passive participle of the key verb used in 1 Corinthians 11:6 and 7 for both a man's and a woman's covering his or her head []")—facts that New Testament scholar Rajesh Gandhi uses to conclude that the passage enjoins the wearing of a cloth veil by Christian women. Biblical scholar Christopher R. Hutson contextualizes the verse citing Greek texts of the same era, such as Moralia:

In the same manner as Paul the Apostle, Philo (30 BC–45 AD) in Special Laws 3:60, uses "head uncovered" and "it is clear that Philo is speaking of a head covering being removed because the priest had just removed her kerchief"; additionally,  likewise "means 'uncovered' in Philo, Allegorical Interpretation II,29, and in Polybius 15,27.2 (second century BC)." In 1 Corinthians 11:16, Paul concludes the teaching about the ordinance of Christian headcovering: "But if anyone wants to argue about this, I simply say that we have no other custom than this, and neither do God's other churches." Michael Marlowe, a scholar of biblical languages, states that Paul's inclusion of this statement was to affirm that the "headcovering practice is a matter of apostolic authority and tradition, and not open to debate", evidenced by repeating a similar sentence with which he starts the passage: "maintain the traditions even as I delivered them to you".

The Lord's Supper (11:17–34)

In verses 17 through 33, Paul chastises the Corinthians for their behaviour when they come together "as a church" (literally , "in church" or "in the assembly") to share what appears to be an agape feast. Paul describes his understanding of Jesus' actions at the Last Supper as having been "received from the Lord" (1 Corinthians 11:23), not received from the apostles who were present or from the tradition of the church. Meyer notes the close similarity between Paul's account of the Last Supper and Luke's in Luke 22:19–20.

See also
 Holy Communion
 Related Bible parts: Luke 22, 1 Corinthians 12,1 Corinthians 13, 1 Corinthians 14,  1 Corinthians 15

References

Texts at Wikisource
1 Corinthians 11 (King James Bible)
1 Corinthians 11 (World English Bible)

Further reading

External links
Head Covering Through the Centuries - Scroll Publishing
What the Early Christians Believed About The Head Covering - Scroll Publishing 
Haman, Head Coverings, and First Corinthians 11:1-16 - Dr. Rajesh Gandhi
The Scriptural Headveiling by Harold S. Martin (1978) - Anabaptist Doctrine
The Head Covering Movement | 1 Corinthians 11 For Today
The Head Coverings of 1 Corinthians 11 (2005) – Rev. Paul K. Williams
The Headcovering: Cultural or Counter-Cultural - Dr. Finny Kuruvilla
Headcoverings in Scripture: What Does Church History Teach? by Greg Price
Is the Headcovering for Today? Why certain Christian denominations practice headcovering
1 Corinthians 11 Text New Revised Standard Version
English Translation with Parallel Latin Vulgate

10